Javier Nicolás Vallejo (born 3 January 2004) is an Argentinian footballer who plays as a forward for Independiente and the Argentina national under-20 football team.

Career
From Chaco Province, Vallejo signed a contract in 2022 keeping him with Independiente until December 2024. In his first league start for the club he scored the only goal of the game in a 1-0 win over Arsenal de Sarandí on the 2 October 2022. This came just days after he missed a spot kick in a penalty shoot out that saw his club defeated in the Copa Argentina. That same month he was celebrated as he scored a late equaliser for this club in a 2-2 league draw against Boca Juniors.

International career
He was named in the Argentina under-20 squad by Javier Mascherano for the 2023 South American U-20 Championship held in Colombia in January and February 2023.

References

External links

2004 births
Living people
Argentine footballers
Association football forwards
Argentine Primera División players
Argentina youth international footballers